Adam Antony Sinclair (born 29 February 1984) is an Indian field hockey player and athlete from Tamil Nadu. Among other leading sporting events he was a member of the Indian field hockey team at the 2004 Summer Olympics in Athens and at the 2006 Asian Games in Doha, Qatar.

Early life
Sinclair hails from Coimbatore. While at school, he was the best in field hockey at Stanes Anglo Indian Higher Secondary School, Coimbatore. He captained the school team and led the school to win many tournaments. He was elected Head Boy for 2001. He was also the captain of the "Panthers" and led them to victory in the Intra School Sports Event in 2001.  He did further studies in PSG College of Arts and Science, Coimbatore.

Career
He made his international debut in May 2004 during a Four Nation Tournament in Gifu (Japan). Sinclair has played for the Chennai Veerans, Chennai Cheetahs has played club hockey in Germany, and as of September 2011 was playing center-forward for the Indian Overseas Bank hockey team.

Athletics
Sinclair has also won accolades and medals as an athlete in the triple jump, high jump and long distance running events.

Personal life
He got engaged to his girlfriend Vyshali Nair on 6 May 2011. They married on 4 May 2012.

Footnotes

External links
 
 

1988 births
Living people
World Series Hockey players
Field hockey players from Tamil Nadu
Field hockey players at the 2004 Summer Olympics
Olympic field hockey players of India
People from Coimbatore
Anglo-Indian people
Field hockey players at the 2006 Asian Games
Indian male field hockey players
Asian Games competitors for India